Eberhard Fischer (born 16 May 1943 in Berlin) is a West German sprint canoeist who competed in the early to mid-1970s. He won two silver medals at the ICF Canoe Sprint World Championships, earning them 1971 (K-4 1000 m) and 1973 (K-4 10000 m).

Fischer also finished fifth in the K-4 1000 m event at the 1972 Summer Olympics in Munich.

References

Sports-reference.com profile

1948 births
Canoeists at the 1972 Summer Olympics
German male canoeists
Living people
Canoeists from Berlin
Olympic canoeists of West Germany
ICF Canoe Sprint World Championships medalists in kayak